Maurizio Bertone, C.R.S. (1639–1701) was a Roman Catholic prelate who served as Bishop of Fossano (1678–1701).

Biography
Maurizio Bertone was born in Chieri, Italy on 6 May 1639 and ordained a priest in the Ordo Clericorum Regularium a Somascha.
On 28 March 1678, he was appointed during the papacy of Pope Innocent XI as Bishop of Fossano.
On 12 April 1678, he was consecrated bishop by Carlo Pio di Savoia, Cardinal-Priest of San Crisogono, with Domenico Gianuzzi, Titular Bishop of Dioclea in Phrygia, serving as co-consecrators. 
He served as Bishop of Fossano until his death on 27 November 1701.

While bishop, he was the principal co-consecrator of François Hyacinthe Valperga di Masino, Bishop of Saint-Jean-de-Maurienne (1687).

References

External links and additional sources
 (for Chronology of Bishops) 
 (for Chronology of Bishops) 

17th-century Italian Roman Catholic bishops
18th-century Italian Roman Catholic bishops
Bishops appointed by Pope Innocent XI
1639 births
1701 deaths
Somascan bishops